The Martin Honner Chalkrock House is a historic house located near Tabor, South Dakota, United States. It was added  to the National Register of Historic Places on July 6, 1987, as part of a "Thematic Nomination of Czech Folk Architecture of Southeastern South Dakota".

See also
National Register of Historic Places listings in Bon Homme County, South Dakota

References

Houses in Bon Homme County, South Dakota
Czech-American culture in South Dakota
Houses on the National Register of Historic Places in South Dakota
National Register of Historic Places in Bon Homme County, South Dakota
Buildings and structures in Tabor, South Dakota